Ghana competed at the 2012 Summer Olympics in London, from 27 July to 12 August 2012. This was the nation's thirteenth appearance at the Summer Olympics, having competed in all but three editions since 1952. Ghana did not attend the 1976 Olympics because of the African boycott and did not attend the 1980 Olympics because of the United States boycott.

The Ghana Olympic Committee sent a total of 9 athletes, 6 men and 3 women, to compete in 4 sports. This equaled the record number of Ghanaian athletes sent to the 2008 Olympics in Beijing, China. Five of the athletes on the team had not previously competed at the Olympic Games, while sprinter Vida Anim became the first Ghanaian female athlete to participate in a fourth Olympic Games. Alberta Ampomah became the first Ghanaian to compete in weightlifting at the Olympic Games. Heavyweight boxer and African champion Maxwell Amponsah, who later withdrew from the Games because of sustained injuries, was the nation's flag bearer at the opening ceremony. The Ghanaian team did not win any medals at the 2012 Olympics.

Athletics

Ghanaian athletes achieved qualifying standards in the following athletics events (up to a maximum of three athletes in each event at the 'A' Standard, and one at the 'B' Standard):

 Key
 Note – Ranks given for track events are within the athlete's heat only
 Q = Qualified for the next round
 q = Qualified for the next round as a fastest loser or, in field events, by position without achieving the qualifying target
 NR = National record
 N/A = Round not applicable for the event
 Bye = Athlete not required to compete in round

Men
Field events

Women
Track & road events

Combined events – Heptathlon

Boxing

Ghana qualified a total of four boxers. Heavyweight boxer Maxwell Amponsah withdrew from the Games after failing to recover from an injury sustained during a qualification match months before the competition.

Men

Judo

Weightlifting

Ghana received one wildcard.

References

External links
 
 

Nations at the 2012 Summer Olympics
2012
Olympics